The International Policy Network (IPN) was a think tank based in the City of London, founded 1971, and closed in September 2011. It was a non-partisan, non-profit organization, but critics said it was a "corporate-funded campaigning group". IPN ran campaigns on issues such as trade, development, healthcare and the environment. IPN’s campaigns were pro-free market.

Vision
According to its website, "IPN aims to empower individuals and promote respect for people and property in order to eliminate poverty, improve human health and protect the environment. IPN promotes public awareness of the importance of this vision for all people, both rich and poor.

"IPN seeks to achieve its vision by promoting the role of market institutions in certain key international policy debates: sustainable development, health, and globalisation and trade. IPN works with academics, think tanks, journalists and policymakers on every continent."

History
IPN was founded as a UK charity by Sir Antony Fisher in 1971. The mission of this body is to "Promote the advancement of learning by research into economic and political science and the publication of such research". The charity’s original name was The International Institute for Economic Research, and now is The Atlas Economic Research Foundation (UK), but operates under the name International Policy Network.

IPN’s sister organization, International Policy Network US Inc., is a non-profit started in 2001.

Funding
IPN is funded entirely by voluntary, charitable gifts from foundations, individuals and businesses. IPN does not receive any funding from governments or political parties, and it does no contract work. IPN develops and implements a research and advocacy agenda that encompasses not one or a few, but many public policy issues.

IPN has received grants totaling hundreds of thousands of pounds from the multinational energy company ExxonMobil, although it has not received money from the energy sector for some years.

Programs
IPN undertakes ongoing work on public policy in the areas of health, environment, economic development, trade, creativity and innovation.

The Freedom to Trade Campaign is run in collaboration with the Atlas Global Initiative. The campaign joins 73 think tanks in 48 countries to support free trade and oppose protectionism.

IPN’s Bastiat Prize for Journalism was founded in 2002. The prize recognises and rewards journalists and commentators who support the free society. This year, IPN will award the first Bastiat Prize for Online Journalism.

Links to other organisations
 The Institute of Economic Affairs
 Atlas Economic Research Foundation
 CriticalOpinion.org
 Electronic Journal of Sustainable Development

IPN was founded by Antony Fisher in the UK as the International Institute for Economic Research (IIER) in 1971. Fisher went on to found the Atlas Economic Research Foundation in the US in 1981, and from this point the IIER traded as Atlas Foundation UK. The organisation underwent a further rebranding in 2001, when it changed its name to IPN. In the US, the Atlas Foundation also provides training and funding to start libertarian think tanks. Fisher founded the influential Institute of Economic Affairs (IEA), a classical liberal think tank based in London. The founding director of IPN, Julian Morris, was previously director of the IEA's Environment and Technology Programme.

People

Past notable trustees/directors
 John Blundell

Past notable staff
 Julian Morris, executive director
 Roger Bate, director (left in 2003)

Some of IPN's partners
 Institute of Public Policy Analysis, Nigeria
 Inter Region Economic Network, Kenya
 Free Market Foundation, South Africa
 Africa Resource Bank
 Action Research Community Health, India
 Institute of Public Affairs, Australia
 Making Our Economy Right, Bangladesh
 Association for Liberal Thinking (Liberal Düşünce Topluluğu), Turkey
 Timbro, Sweden
 Liberty Institute, India
 Centre for Civil Society, India
 Institute of Economic Affairs
 Montreal Economic Institute
 Centro de Divulgacion del Conocimiento Economico, Venezuela
 Libertad y Desarrollo, Chile
 Fundacion Libertad Democracia y Desarrollo, Bolivia
 Instituto de Libre Empresa, Peru
 The Lion Rock Institute, Hong Kong
 Instituto Liberdade, Brazil

References

External links
 last archive.org snapshot of IPN US web site
 
 Profile at LobbyWatch.org
 Profile at CarbonBrief.org
 Entry for IPN on the SourceWatch web site.
 George Monbiot, "Smoke in our eyes", The Guardian, 27 September 2006
 George Monbiot, "Pundits who contest climate change should tell us who is paying them", The Guardian, 26 September 2006

Climate change denial
Libertarian organisations based in the United Kingdom
Libertarian think tanks
Organizations disestablished in 2011
Think tanks established in 1971
Organizations of environmentalism skeptics and critics
Political and economic think tanks based in the United Kingdom
1971 establishments in England